The Eastern Kansas League was a  minor league baseball league that played in the 1910 season. The six–team Class D level Eastern Kansas League consisted of franchises based exclusively in Kansas. The Eastern Kansas League permanently folded after the 1910 season.

History
The Eastern Kansas League began play on June 8, 1910, as six charter members formed for the 1910 Class D level League. The Eastern Kansas League was one of three leagues playing in Kansas in 1910, joining the Kansas State League and Central Kansas League. The Eastern Kansas League charter league members beginning the season were the Hiawatha Indians, Holton, Horton, Kansas, Marysville, Kansas, Sabetha, Kansas and Seneca.

On August 25, 1910, during the 1910 season, Holton, with a 15-31 record, moved to Blue Rapids, Kansas. Both the Marysville and Horton franchises permanently disbanded on September 1, 1910.

The league schedule ended on September 15, 1910. The final Eastern Kansas League standings featured the 1st place Sabetha team with a record of 53–28, followed by Seneca (46–39), Hiawatha Indians (44–44), Marysville (38–39), Horton (35–38) and Holton/Blue Rapids (26–54) in the six–team league. The 1910 Hiawatha team was also referred to as the "Boosters."

The Eastern Kansas League permanently folded after their only season in 1910. On February 10, 1911, the  Eastern Kansas League owners met in Hiawatha to discuss the 1911 season. During the meeting, the possibility of adding teams from Atchison, Kansas and Leavenworth, Kansas to the league was discussed. However, the league never began the 1911 season, folding in early May. Problems with ballpark leases in Sabetha and Horton were problematic to the franchises continuing. Besides Hiawatha, no league cities ever hosted minor league baseball teams again.

1910 Eastern Kansas League teams

Standing & statistics

1910 Eastern Kansas League

References

External links
Baseball Reference

Defunct minor baseball leagues in the United States
Baseball leagues in Kansas
Defunct professional sports leagues in the United States
Sports leagues established in 1910
Sports leagues disestablished in 1910
1910 establishments in Kansas